140th meridian may refer to:

140th  meridian east, a line of longitude east of the Greenwich Meridian
140th meridian west, a line of longitude west of the Greenwich Meridian